Nikos Ekonomopoulos (Greek Νίκος Οικονομόπουλος Nikos Ikonomopoulos, also: Nick Ekonomopoulos; born 22 February 1982 in Athens) is a Greek pool player. Ekonomopoulos won the Junior 8-ball World Championship in 2000. Ekonomopoulos reached the final of the 2014 World Pool Masters losing to Shane Van Boening in the final 8–2.

Titles
 2012 Euro Tour Austria Open

References

External links
 Profile on azbilliards.com

Living people
1982 births
Greek pool players
Sportspeople from Athens